QUIKSCRIPT is a simulation language derived from SIMSCRIPT, based on 20-GATE.

References 

 "Quikscript - A Simscript-like Language for the G-20", F.M. Tonge et al., Communications of the ACM 8(6):350–354 (June 1965).

Simulation programming languages